Red Hill Patrick Henry National Memorial, in Charlotte County, Virginia, near the Town of Brookneal, is the final home and burial place of Founding Father Patrick Henry, the fiery legislator and orator of the American Revolution. Henry bought Red Hill Plantation at his retirement in 1794 and occupied it until 1799, the year of his death. In addition to the main house, Henry used another building as his law office. There were also dependencies and slave quarters on the working 2,930-acre tobacco plantation. The plantation was located on the Staunton River for transportation.

Congress authorized the establishment of a Patrick Henry National Monument on August 15, 1935 (49 Stat. 652) pending the acquisition of the property by the Secretary of the Interior. The purchase never occurred, and the enabling legislation was repealed on December 21, 1944 (58 Stat. 852).

The site was taken over by the Patrick Henry Memorial Foundation, established in 1944, which in the 1950s and 1960s restored Henry's law office and preserved his grave onsite. It also reconstructed his last home and several dependencies. A new museum was built to provide for interpretation of his life and place in 1976.

Red Hill Plantation was listed on the National Register of Historic Places on February 14, 1978. The national memorial was authorized by the United States Congress on May 13, 1986. Owned by the Patrick Henry Memorial Foundation, Red Hill is operated as a house museum and is an affiliated area of the National Park Service, meaning that the Foundation can request certain assistance from the NPS in preserving and interpreting the site.

Planning in the 2000s for the site includes a master plan to guide improvements. The first project, supported by 2006 grant money, will be improvements and additions of walking trails to help visitors understand transportation and plantation agriculture.  It will relate the site to 18th century bateaux trade and transportation along the river, its ferry site, and the later addition of a 19th-century "former railroad whistle stop". It will restore plantation roads to the plantation distillery, laundry and graveyard of enslaved African Americans. Currently, the Patrick Henry Memorial Foundation cares for about 1,000 acres of Henry's original land.

Gallery

See also
 Birthplace of Patrick Henry
 Pine Slash
 Scotchtown plantation
 Leatherwood Plantation
 List of national memorials of the United States

References

External links

 Red Hill — Patrick Henry Memorial Foundation
 Red Hill, Law Office, State Route 619, Brookneal, Campbell County, VA at the Historic American Buildings Survey (HABS)
 Red Hill, 7 Miles Southeast of Brookneal, VA, south of State Route 619, Brookneal, Campbell County, VA at HABS

Museums in Charlotte County, Virginia
National Memorials of the United States
Houses on the National Register of Historic Places in Virginia
Houses in Charlotte County, Virginia
Plantation houses in Virginia
Protected areas established in 1986
History museums in Virginia
Open-air museums in Virginia
Henry, Patrick
Georgian architecture in Virginia
1986 establishments in Virginia
National Register of Historic Places in Charlotte County, Virginia
Patrick Henry
Historic American Buildings Survey in Virginia
Monuments and memorials on the National Register of Historic Places in Virginia
Slave cabins and quarters in the United States
Homes of United States Founding Fathers